KEUC (104.9 FM) is a radio station licensed to Ringwood, Oklahoma, United States. The station is currently owned by Oklahoma Catholic Broadcasting, Inc.

KEUC broadcasts a Catholic Religious format to the Ringwood, Oklahoma, area.

History
This station was assigned call sign KEUC on December 5, 2013.

References

External links
okcr.org

EUC
Catholic radio stations
Radio stations established in 2016
2016 establishments in Oklahoma